The Department of Labour is a West Bengal government department. It is an interior ministry mainly responsible for the administration of the development of labour.

List of Ministers
 Moloy Ghatak
 Jakir Hossain (MoS)
 Nirmal Maji (MoS)
 Md. Ghulam Rabbani (MoS)

Introduction
The Department of Labour, Government of West Bengal, is responsible for the development of labours in the state of West Bengal. This Department, West Bengal aims atenhancing the quality of life of workers by providing social security, creating an environment that is conducive for investments in the State and at adherence to Acts and Rules that promoteproductive industrial relations. Regulatory parameters have been considerably reformed under the Ease of Doing Business in West Bengal. The Department is steadfast in its endeavour towards making the delivery of services user-friendly and completely online by 2018.

References

Government departments of West Bengal
West Bengal